Oury is a department or commune of Balé Province in southern Burkina Faso. Its capital lies at the town of Oury. According to the 1996 census the department has a total population of 24,914.

Towns and villages
Towns and villages and populations in the department are as follows:

 Oury	(3 908 inhabitants) (capital)
 Bandiara	(442 inhabitants)
 Da	(1 825 inhabitants)
 Dablara	(452 inhabitants)
 Habé	(637 inhabitants)
 Koena	(1 013 inhabitants)
 Koupelo	(653 inhabitants)
 Lasso	(1 068 inhabitants)
 Momina	(437 inhabitants)
 Mou	(1 308 inhabitants)
 Oullo	(2 118 inhabitants)
 Sani	(1 434 inhabitants)
 Sanfo	(557 inhabitants)
 Séréna	(2 245 inhabitants)
 Seyou	(1 147 inhabitants)
 Siou	(2 531 inhabitants)
 Soubouy	(1 495 inhabitants)
 Taplara	(372 inhabitants)
 Zinakongo	(1 272 inhabitants)

References

Departments of Burkina Faso
Balé Province